Centro Vitivinícola Nacional is an organization that groups together Argentine wine producers. It was established in 1905.

References

Agricultural organisations based in Argentina
Wine industry organizations
Argentine wine